Alexandrovka is a rural locality (a village) in Buzyurovsky Selsoviet, Bakalinsky District, Bashkortostan, Russia. The population was 49 as of 2010. There are 2 streets.

Geography 
Alexandrovka is located 28 km southwest of Bakaly (the district's administrative centre) by road. Kholodny Klyuch is the nearest rural locality.

References 

Rural localities in Bakalinsky District